The 2013–14 Liga Profesional de Primera División season, also known as the 2013–14 Copa Uruguaya or the 2013–14 Campeonato Uruguayo, was the 110th season of Uruguay's top-flight football league, and the 83rd in which wat is professional. Peñarol was the defending champion. Danubio won the title, their fourth league championship victory in the club's history.

Teams
Sixteen teams competed in the Primera División during this season. Thirteen teams remained from the 2012–13 season. Bella Vista, Progreso, and Central Español were relegated after accumulating the fewest points in the relegation table. They were replaced by Sud América, Rentistas, and Miramar Misiones, the 2012–13 Segunda División winner, runner-up, and playoff winner, respectively. All of the new teams made repeat appearances in the top division.

Torneo Apertura

Standings

Results

Torneo Clausura

Standings

Results

Aggregate table

Relegation

Championship playoff
Danubio and Montevideo Wanderers qualified to the championship playoffs as the Apertura and Clausura winners, respectively. Additionally, Montevideo Wanderers re-qualified as the team with the most points in the season aggregate table. Given this situation, an initial playoff was held between the two teams. Montevideo Wanderers would become the season champion with a win; Danubio needed to win the playoff to force a two-legged final.

Semifinal

Finals

References

External links
Asociación Uruguaya de Fútbol 
Tournament regulations 

2013-14
1
2013 in South American football leagues
2014 in South American football leagues